is a spin-off from the Tales RPG series made by Namco. The game was released exclusively in Japan for the Game Boy Advance on October, 2002. While it succeeds Tales of Phantasia: Narikiri Dungeon, this was the first game in the Tales of the World series, which is known for featuring characters from various main Tales games.

Narikiri Dungeon 2, like Tales of Phantasia: Narikiri Dungeon, is a dungeon crawler/RPG. It features the Condensed Linear Motion Battle System, a variation of the series' trademark battle system.

Characters

Main
Frio Sven: The hero of the story. He is an apprentice blacksmith who is quick to jump into action, despite the fact that it always winds up getting him into trouble. He has a rather short attention span and is constantly getting on Kyaro's nerves, especially when he shows his obliviousness to her love for him.

Kyaro Olange: The logical heroine of the tale. She is interested in the tales told to her by the village elder, Lyle. She always tries to be the adult in the group and usually ends up dragging Frio out of trouble. Kyaro is always being irritated by the way he and the village children are always doing something to stir up trouble.

Thanatos: The antagonist. He is an enigma wrapped in mystery. He is able to possess the heroes through the use of the black crystals. He speaks of cleansing this world of the "human filth who have betrayed my mama and me". Sadly, he refuses to rationalize with anybody. Thanatos also seems to wish for Ada and Stella, the two Goddesses of their world, to perish as well.

Goddesses
Ada: The goddess of the future. The eldest Goddess. Kind, gentle and logical. She watches over the Great Tree, and summons the heroes from the other worlds to assist Frio and Kyaro.

Ciel: The goddess of the present. The middle Goddess. Selfless, wise, and brave. Millennia ago, she went missing. Believed to have sacrificed herself in order to destroy the mysterious Dragon God. She has never been seen since. But it is shown that she is missed by her sisters in the start of the game.

Stella: The goddess of the past. The youngest Goddess. Curious, vigilant, and idealistic. She is particularly interested in the human race.

Reception
On release, Famitsu magazine scored the game a 32 out of 40.

References

External links
Bandai Namco's Website for Tales of Phantasia: Narikiri Dungeon 2

2002 video games
Alfa System games
Game Boy Advance games
Game Boy Advance-only games
Japan-exclusive video games
World: Narikiri Dungeon 2, Tales of the
Telenet Japan games
Video game sequels
Video games developed in Japan